Teddy at the Throttle is a 1917 American silent comedy short film starring Bobby Vernon, Gloria Swanson, and Wallace Beery. Wallace Beery and Gloria Swanson were briefly husband and wife offscreen during this period.

Cast
 Bobby Vernon as Bobbie Knight
 Gloria Swanson as Gloria Dawn
 Wallace Beery as Henry Black
 May Emory as The Guardian's Sister
 Blanche Phillips as The Boy's Mercenary Aunt
 Teddy the Dog as Teddy
 Roxana McGowan

References

External links

 
 
 

1917 films
American silent short films
American black-and-white films
Keystone Studios films
Films directed by Clarence G. Badger
1917 comedy films
1917 short films
Silent American comedy films
Articles containing video clips
American comedy short films
1910s American films